Pavlo Anatoliyovych Sirotin (born 29 September 1967 in Frunze, USSR) is a Soviet and Ukrainian professional football player and manager.

Career
Pavlo Sirotin during his long football career has played as goalkeeper from 1983 for the Kyrgyzstani clubs TSOR Frunze, Alga Frunze, Alay Osh and from 1992 for the Ukrainian clubs Krystal Chortkiv, Kremin Kremenchuk, Bukovyna Chernivtsi, Prykarpattya Ivano-Frankivsk, Nyva Ternopil, Lukor Kalush and FC Luzhany.

In 2009, he started his coaching career. He helped to train goalkeepers in Bukovyna Chernivtsi. In 2010, he worked as head coach of the Dordoi-94 Bishkek and since 2011 until 2012 he coached the Alga Bishkek.

References

External links
 
 Profile at allplayers.in.ua
 Profile at FootballFacts.ru

1967 births
Living people
Kyrgyzstani footballers
Kyrgyzstani expatriate footballers
Kyrgyzstani people of Ukrainian descent
Soviet footballers
Ukrainian footballers
Association football goalkeepers
FC Alga Bishkek players
FC Alay players
FC Kremin Kremenchuk players
FC Bukovyna Chernivtsi players
FC Spartak Ivano-Frankivsk players
FC Luzhany players
Nyva Ternopil players
Ukrainian football managers
Kyrgyzstani football managers
FC Alga Bishkek managers
Sportspeople from Bishkek